Barlen may refer to:

 Bob Barlen (born 1980), Canadian screenwriter and producer
 Barlen Pyamootoo (born 1960), Mauritian filmmaker and writer
 Barlen Vyapoory (born 1945), Mauritian politician and diplomat who served as the fifth Vice President of Mauritius
 Arthur, Ann, and Det. Bill Barlen, characters in 1970 American sexploitation film The Amazing Transplant